Luna Park is an amusement park in Coney Island, Brooklyn, New York City. It opened on May 29, 2010, at the site of Astroland, an amusement park that had been in operation from 1962 to 2008, and Dreamland, which operated at the same site for the 2009 season. It was named after the original 1903 Luna Park which operated until 1944 on a site just north of the current park's 1000 Surf Avenue location.

The park was designed, developed, and operated by Central Amusement International, LLC (CAI), a subsidiary of the Italian company Zamperla which built 19 new mechanical rides for the park. There are also interactive games, food and beverage concessions, and live entertainment.

As of 2017, the park's general manager was Fernando Velasquez.

History

In September 2003, Mayor Michael Bloomberg, the New York City Council and Brooklyn Borough President Marty Markowitz formed the Coney Island Development Corporation (CIDC). The corporation released the "Coney Island Revitalization Plan" in 2005, which laid out its plan to preserve and grow the historic amusement area.

At the end of the 2008 season, the Coney Island Astroland amusement park closed. In 2009, a traveling carnival operated amusement rides on the Astroland site, renaming it Dreamland. On February 16, 2010, New York City Mayor Michael Bloomberg announced the winning bid to develop and operate an amusement park to be constructed on the  former site of Astroland in Coney Island would be awarded to Zamperla/Central Amusement International under a 10-year lease.

The new Luna Park was widely advertised across New York City in posters, billboards, and advertisements on the side of public buses as part of an advertisement for the attractions at Coney Island. The ads boasted the punchlines "Thrill is nothing without speed", referring to the various thrill rides at the park and "The FUN is back at Coney Island" referring to the Coney Island restoration project. The park opened on May 29, 2010.

Besides the new rides brought in by Zamperla, many older rides from Astroland were incorporated into Luna Park. These included the old park's centerpiece, "Astrotower", which was not operational; another inherited ride was the landmarked Cyclone roller coaster, which was leased out to Astroland in 1975. Some of the other old spaced themed elements were incorporated into the amusement areas.

On July 2, 2013, Luna Park was evacuated as a precaution due to a problem with the Astrotower swaying; part of the attraction remained closed over the Fourth of July. During that time, construction crews worked day and night to dismantle the tower and by July 6 it had been reduced to a four foot high stump with the pieces sold to a local junkyard for scrap.

In May 2014, the Thunderbolt steel coaster opened at Luna Park. It was named after the 1925 coaster that had been demolished in 2000.

In August 2018, the New York City Economic Development Corporation and the New York City Department of Parks and Recreation announced that Luna Park would be expanded. The new rides would be located on a  city-operated parcel between West 15th and West 16th Streets, next to the new Thunderbolt coaster. The rides would include a  log flume called the Super Flume(Working Title), as well as a circus themedzip-line and a ropes course called "Sky Chaser" after a naming contest by fans, a family coaster  called "Tony's Express"(After Zamperla's Founder, Antonio Zamperla), and possibly a water drop tower. that were originally scheduled to open in 2020. There would also be a public plaza and an amusement arcade within the newly expanded amusement area. These construction projects were placed on hold in early 2020 with the COVID-19 pandemic in New York City. Alessandro Zamperla, president of Luna Park's owner Central Amusement International, stated in mid-2020 that he hoped to have these rides open in 2021. The park reopened for the 2021 season, and the expansion started in October 2021.

Description

Luna Park's entrance is patterned after the entrance to the original 1903 Luna Park and was built on the ground of the former Astroland amusement park. It has 19 new attractions and games. It is the only area on Coney Island where the use of cash to pay for amusements and rides is not allowed; visitors must buy Luna Cards and spend Luna Credits or use an unlimited ride wristband that allows four hours of ride time on select rides. Variations of the Coney Island "Funny Face" logo can be seen throughout the park. The logo, from the early days of George C. Tilyou's Steeplechase Park, was created about 100 years ago.

Attractions
Luna Park has 36 attractions designed and manufactured by Antonio Zamperla, SpA (Zamperla), based in Vicenza, Italy. Luna Park also operates the Coney Island Cyclone, an official city and national landmark. Six rides, including some from the former Victorian Gardens Amusement Park, were placed in the area where the Wild River was located for the 2021 season.

Thrill Rides

 Atlantic Aviator
 Brooklyn Flyer
 Clockworkz
 Coney Clipper
 Cyclone
 Electro Spin
 Luna 360
 The Tickler (2010 roller coaster)
Thunderbolt (2014 roller coaster)
 Tony's Express
 Leti's Treasure
 Sky Chaser

Family Rides
 Circus Coaster
 Coney Island Hang Glider
 Coney Tower
 Lynn's Trapeze
 WindstarZ

Kiddie Rides

 B&B Carousell
 Brooklyn Barge
 Convoy
 Magic Bikes
 Seaside Swing
 Big Top Express
 Speed Boat
 Tea Party
 Circus Candy
 Fire Patrol

Victorian Gardens Rides

 Rainbowheel
 Aeromax
 Grand Prix
 Mini Mouse

Scream Zone

For the 2011 season, an addition called Scream Zone opened that featured four rides. Since then, more rides have been added in a secondary section.

Rides

 Astro Tower (Named after Astroland's Astro Tower)
 Coney Island Raceway - Go-Kart Track
 Endeavor
 Slingshot
 Steeplechase (2011 Roller Coaster) - A Zamperla launching motocoaster with trains resembling horses
 Soarin' Eagle - A Zamperla "flying" coaster where riders lie on their stomachs and cars go up a spiral lift hill
 Zenobio - A booster-type ride

Nearby Attractions
 Brooklyn Go-Kart - A kiddie version of the Coney Island Raceway, with different owners
 El Dorado's Auto Scooters - Bumper Cars
 Brooklyn Mini Golf
 Swinging Ship
 Coney Art Walls- A collection of public murals with an event venue and a Coney-Island theme, though some of the murals have been vandalized.
 Maimonides Park – a minor league ballpark that is home of the Brooklyn Cyclones
 Nathan's Famous, the original location of the chain

Arcades and Games
 Luna Park Arcade
 Warpzone Retro Darkade - A small arcade featuring retro arcade games.
 There are also many stall games spread through the area of the park.

See also
Luna Park, list of parks based on the original Luna Park

References

External links

Oral histories about Luna Park (2010-) collected by the Coney Island History Project

Coney Island
Amusement parks in New York (state)
2010 establishments in New York City
Amusement parks opened in 2010